José Miguel Villalobos Chan (born June 5, 1981) is a Costa Rican professional footballer who plays as a defender for Uruguay de Coronado.

Club career
Villalobos made his debut for Cartaginés in 2000 and played for 10 years with the side during two spells, both sides of a couple of seasons at Herediano, before eventually moving to Pérez Zeledón in summer 2014. He signed for Uruguay de Coronado ahead of the 2015 Verano season.

International career
He was a member of Costa Rica U23 team who competed at 2004 Summer Olympics, playing the full 90 minutes in all matches as Costa Rica lost to Argentina on the quarterfinals and scoring in the group stage match against Portugal. Villalobos was called up for the first time to the senior national team in August 2009, but has not yet made a competitive appearance for the full squad.

References

External links
 José Villalobos at playmakerstats.com (English version of ogol.com.br)

1981 births
Living people
Association football defenders
Costa Rican footballers
Olympic footballers of Costa Rica
Footballers at the 2004 Summer Olympics
C.S. Cartaginés players
C.S. Herediano footballers
Municipal Pérez Zeledón footballers